Orders and decorations conferred to military personnel of the Singapore Armed Forces in Singapore, listed by order of precedence:

Medals and Orders currently issued to service members
  Darjah Utama Bakti Cemerlang (Tentera) (Distinguished Service Order (Military)) - DUBC
  Pingat Gagah Perkasa (Tentera) (Conspicuous Gallantry Medal (Military)) - PGP
  Pingat Jasa Gemilang (Tentera) (Meritorious Service Medal (Military) - PJG
  Pingat Pentadbiran Awam, Emas (Tentera) (Public Administration Medal, Gold (Military)) - PPA(E)
  Pingat Pentadbiran Awam, Perak (Tentera) (Public Administration Medal, Silver (Bar) (Military)) - PPA(P)(L)
  Pingat Pentadbiran Awam, Perak (Tentera) (Public Administration Medal, Silver (Military)) - PPA(P)
  Pingat Pentadbiran Awam, Gangsa (Tentera) (Public Administration Medal, Bronze (Military)) - PPA(G)
  Pingat Penghargaan (Tentera) (Commendation Medal (Military))
  Pingat Berkebolehan (Tentera) (Efficiency Medal (Military)) - PB
  Pingat Bakti Setia (Long Service Medal (Military)) - PBS
  Singapore Armed Forces Long Service and Good Conduct (35 Years) Medal with 40 year clasp
  Singapore Armed Forces Long Service and Good Conduct (35 Years) Medal
  Singapore Armed Forces Long Service and Good Conduct (20 Years) Medal with 30 year clasp
  Singapore Armed Forces Long Service and Good Conduct (20 Years) Medal
  Singapore Armed Forces Long Service and Good Conduct (10 Years) Medal with 15 year clasp
  Singapore Armed Forces Long Service and Good Conduct (10 Years) Medal
  Singapore Armed Forces National Service Medal with 15 year clasp
  Singapore Armed Forces National Service Medal
  Singapore Armed Forces Good Service Medal
  Singapore Armed Forces Overseas Service Medal with bronze star
  Singapore Armed Forces Overseas Service Medal
  Tsunami Relief Operation Medal
  Pingat Jasa Perwira (Tentera) Singapore Armed Forces Medal for Distinguished Act

Foreign and International Awards

Below are some of the awards, medals and orders that various military personnel have earned or been accorded to

  Legion D'Honneur (Commandeur)
  The Most Exalted Order of Paduka Keberanian Laila Terbilang (1st Class), Brunei
  Bintang Yudha Dharma Utama (1st Class), Indonesia
  Bintang Kartika Eka Pakçi Utama (1st Class) (Army Meritorious Service Star), Indonesia
  Bintang Jalasena Utama (1st Class) (Navy Meritorious Service Star), Indonesia
  Bintang Swa Bhuwana Paksa Utama (1st Class) (Air Force Meritorious Service Star), Indonesia
  Knight Grand Cross of The Most Exalted Order of the White Elephant, Thailand
  Knight Grand Cross of the Most Noble Order of the Crown, Thailand
  Darjah Panglima Gagah Angkatan Tentera (Honorary Malaysian Armed Forces Order for Valour) (First Degree), Malaysia
  Order of the Sacred Tripod (寶鼎勳章) with Grand Cordon (大綬) (2nd Class)
  Order of the Cloud and Banner (雲麾勳章) with Yellow Grand Cordon (黃色大綬) (3rd Class)
  Order of National Security Merit Tong-il Medal (통일장) (1st Grade)
  Order of National Security Merit Cheonsu Medal (천수장) (3rd Grade)
  Legion Of Merit (Commander)
  Bronze Star Medal
  Meritorious Service Medal
  Joint Service Commendation Medal
  Army Commendation Medal
  Army Achievement Medal
  Order of King Abdulaziz (3rd Class)
  UK Gulf Medal
  Commemorative Medal for Peace Keeping Operations (Herinneringsmedaille Vredesoperaties), Netherlands
  United Nations Iraq / Kuwait Observers Mission (UNIKOM) Medal
  International Force East Timor Medal
  MINUGUA - United Nations Verification Mission in Guatemala
  UNMISET - United Nations Mission of Support in East Timor
  United Nations Headquarters New York (UNHQ) Medal
  NATO Medal (Non-Article 5)
  UK Royal Military Academy Sandhurst Medal

Badges

Exceptional Skills Badges

Military Free Fall Parachutist

Parachutist

Skills Badges

Basic Airborne Course (BAC)

Jungle Confidence Course (JCC)

Combat Skills

Explosive Ordnance Disposal (EOD)

CBRD (Chemical, Biological & Radiological Defence)

Basic Rigger Course (BRC)

Sniper
 Sniper Basic Badge
 Sniper Advanced Badge
 Sniper Master Badge

Combat Fitness Trainer

Ammunition (Ammo)

Others
 Silent Precision Drill Badge

 Paramedic Badge

 Taekwondo Black Belt Badge

 Musician
 Musician Badge
 Director of Music Badge

Skills Tabs

Proficiency Badges
 IPPT Gold Award Badge
 IPPT Silver Award Badge
 Marksmanship Badge

Incentive Badges
 Best Soldier of the Month Badge
 Safe and Courteous Driver Badge

Identification Badge
 Para Counsellor Badge
 Aide-de-Camp Badge
 SAF Shooting Contingent Badge

Navy-related badges
 Naval Warfare Badge

Naval Diver's Badge

 Submariner's Badge
 Mission Crew Wing
 Naval Warfare System Engineers
 Engineers Badge
 Naval Warfare System Experts
 Command and Control (C2) Badge
 Communication Systems (CS) Badge
 Electronic Warfare Systems (EWS) Badge
 Mechanical Systems (MS)/Electrical Control Systems (ECS)/Naval Architects (NARC) Badge
 Naval Supply Experts/Naval Chefs Badge
 Navigation Systems (NVS) Badge
 Weapon Systems (WS)/Weapon Control Systems Operator (WS-C) Badge
 Underwater Warfare Badge
 CIC Supervisor's Badge
 Craft Coxswain Skill Badge
 MARSEC Boarding Skills Badge

Air Force badges

 Air Electronic Warfare Badge

See also
 Awards For Singapore National Serviceman

References

Military awards and decorations of Singapore